Little Leviathan is an album by singer Michelle Lewis. The album was released in 1998, and the lead single "Nowhere and Everywhere" reached number #40 on the US Hot Adult Top 40 chart, and #21 on the Bubbling Under Hot 100 Singles chart.  The album was produced by Steve Fisk.

Track listing

Credits
Michael Barbiero – Producer, Mixing 
Jack Daley – Bass 
Andy Ezrin – Keyboards 
Ken Feldman – Assistant Engineer 
Steve Fisk – Producer, Loops 
Keith Golden – Bass 
John Goodmanson – Engineer, Mixing 
Warren Haynes – Guitar 
Femio Hernández – Mixing Assistant 
Ted Jensen – Mastering 
Teddy Kumpel – Guitar and Additional Production
Dayna Kurtz – Background Vocals
John Leventhal – Organ, Guitar, Piano, Background Vocals, Producer 
Michelle Lewis – Guitar, Guitar (Electric), Vocals
Tom Lord-Alge – Mixing 
Richard Pagano – Drums 
Shawn Pelton – Drums 
Tony Scherr – Bass, Bass (Acoustic) 
Bill Wittman – Engineer 
Joe Zook – Assistant Producer

Charts
Single

References 

1998 albums
Giant Records (Warner) albums
Michelle Lewis albums